Atlantic Bank may refer to:

 Atlantic Bank of New York
 Atlantic National Bank, Jacksonville, Florida
 Atlantic National Bank (New York City)
 Atlantic Bank & Trust, Charleston-based bank failed in 2011
 Atlantic Bank Group constituent banks in West Africa